Cristiano Silva Felício (born July 7, 1992) is a Brazilian professional basketball player for Covirán Granada of the Spanish Liga ACB. He previously played in his home country of Brazil for Minas Tênis Clube and Flamengo, in the National Basketball Association for the Chicago Bulls, and in Germany for ratiopharm Ulm.

Professional career

Minas Tênis Clube (2009–2012) 
After playing professionally in Brazil for Minas Tênis Clube between 2009 and 2012, Felício moved to Sacramento, California to attend CCSE Prep Academy in 2012–13 before attempting to gain NCAA eligibility to attend the University of Oregon in 2013–14.

Flamengo (2013–2015) 
Felicio was later deemed ineligible to play college basketball and returned to Brazil, where he played a further two seasons for Flamengo, winning both the 2014 FIBA Americas League and FIBA Intercontinental Cup.

Chicago Bulls (2015–2021)
After joining the Chicago Bulls for the 2015 NBA Summer League, Felício signed with the team on July 12, 2015. On December 31, 2015, using the flexible assignment rule, he was assigned to the Canton Charge, the D-League affiliate of the Cleveland Cavaliers. He was recalled by the Bulls on January 13, reassigned to Canton on January 15, and recalled again on January 16. On March 17, he recorded six points and a season-high 10 rebounds in a 118–102 win over the Brooklyn Nets. Two days later, he made his first career start, replacing the injured Pau Gasol in the Bulls' 92–85 win over the Utah Jazz. On April 9, he had a season-best game in the Bulls' 105–102 win over the Cleveland Cavaliers. Felício was 7-for-7 from the field, scored 16 points, grabbed five rebounds, blocked two shots and dished out an assist in 23 minutes. Two days later, he scored 16 points for the second straight game, helping the Bulls defeat the New Orleans Pelicans 121–116.

On November 26, 2016, Felício was assigned to Chicago's new D-League affiliate, the Windy City Bulls. He was recalled the next day. On December 30, 2016, he grabbed a season-high 12 rebounds in a 111–101 loss to the Indiana Pacers. On January 12, 2017, he scored a season-high 13 points in a 104–89 loss to the New York Knicks.

On July 6, 2017, Felício re-signed with the Bulls. On March 19, 2018, he scored a career-high 17 points in a 110–92 loss to the New York Knicks.

ratiopharm Ulm (2021–2022) 
On August 9, 2021, Felicio signed with ratiopharm Ulm of the Basketball Bundesliga.

Granada (2022–present) 
For the 2022–23 season, Felicio signed with Covirán Granada  of the Spanish Liga ACB.

National team career
Felício has been a member of the senior Brazilian national basketball team. With Brazil, he has played at the following major tournaments: the 2012 FIBA South American Championship, the 2013 FIBA AmeriCup, the 2014 FIBA South American Championship, and the 2016 Rio Olympics. He won the bronze medal at the 2014 FIBA South American Championship.

NBA career statistics

Regular season

|-
| style="text-align:left;"| 
| style="text-align:left;"| Chicago
| 31 || 4 || 10.4 || .556 || .000 || .714 || 3.3 || .8 || .2 || .4 || 3.4
|-
| style="text-align:left;"| 
| style="text-align:left;"| Chicago
| 66 || 0 || 15.8 || .579 || – || .645 || 4.7 || .6 || .4 || .3 || 4.8
|-
| style="text-align:left;"| 
| style="text-align:left;"| Chicago
| 55 || 16 || 17.8 || .591 || .000 || .667 || 4.2 || 1.0 || .3 || .2 || 5.6
|-
| style="text-align:left;"| 
| style="text-align:left;"| Chicago
| 60 || 0 || 12.4 || .531 || .000 || .685 || 3.6 || .6 || .2 || .1 || 4.0
|-
| style="text-align:left;"| 
| style="text-align:left;"| Chicago
| 22 || 0 || 17.5 || .630 || .000 || .783 || 4.6 || .7 || .5 || .1 || 3.9
|-
| style="text-align:left;"| 
| style="text-align:left;"| Chicago
| 18 || 0 || 4.7 || .538 || .000 || .563 || 1.4 || .5 || .2 || .0 || 1.3
|- class="sortbottom"
| style="text-align:center;" colspan="2"| Career
| 252 || 20 || 14.1 || .572 || .000 || .673 || 3.9 || .7 || .3 || .2 || 4.3

Playoffs

|-
| style="text-align:left;"| 2017
| style="text-align:left;"| Chicago
| 6 || 0 || 13.7 || .600 || .000 || .500 || 4.3 || .3 || .5 || .3 || 3.2
|-
| style="text-align:center;" colspan="2"| Career
| 6 || 0 || 13.7 || .600 || .000 || .500 || 4.3 || .3 || .5 || .3 || 3.2

References

External links

FIBA Profile
Basketball-Stats Profile

1992 births
Living people
2019 FIBA Basketball World Cup players
Basketball players at the 2011 Pan American Games
Basketball players at the 2016 Summer Olympics
Brazilian men's basketball players
Brazilian expatriate basketball people in the United States
Canton Charge players
Centers (basketball)
Chicago Bulls players
Flamengo basketball players
Fundación CB Granada players
Minas Tênis Clube basketball players
National Basketball Association players from Brazil
Novo Basquete Brasil players
Olympic basketball players of Brazil
Pan American Games competitors for Brazil
Power forwards (basketball)
Ratiopharm Ulm players
Sportspeople from Minas Gerais
Undrafted National Basketball Association players
Windy City Bulls players